Edward Ośko (born 13 January 1957 in Podebłocie) is a Polish politician. He was elected to the Sejm on 25 September 2005, getting 5725 votes in 35 Olsztyn district as a candidate from the League of Polish Families list.

See also
Members of Polish Sejm 2005-2007

External links
Officjal website of Edward Osko LPR
Edward Ośko - parliamentary page - includes declarations of interest, voting record, and transcripts of speeches.

1957 births
Living people
People from Garwolin County
Members of the Polish Sejm 2005–2007
League of Polish Families politicians